The black gang are the members of a ship's crew who work in the fire room/engine room; they are also called stokers or firemen.  They are called "black" because of the soot and coal dust that is thick in the air in the fire room/engine room.  The term began being used in the days of coal-fired steamships.  The term is commonly used in the United States Coast Guard and United States Navy to describe personnel in "M" and "B" divisions.

References

United States Navy personnel